Minister of Health is a government minister in charge of the Madagascar's Ministry of Public Health (Ministère de la Santé Publique) of Madagascar.

List
Jean Jacques Seraphin (before 1976 - after 1986)
Johanita Ndahimananjara (before 2011-after 2013) 
Mamy Lalatiana Andriamanarivo (before 2015 - after 2018) 
Ahmad Ahmad (?-Aug 2020)
Jean Louis Hanitrala Rakotovao (Aug 2020-)

See also 
 Health minister

References

External links

Government of Madagascar
Government ministers of Madagascar